"Meet Your Mama" is a song recorded by Canadian country music group James Barker Band. The band's frontman James Barker wrote the song along with Gavin Slate, Travis Wood, and producer Todd Clark. It marks the band's first release after signing with RECORDS Nashville in 2023.

Background
The band's frontman James Barker stated the song is about "that feeling of being early on in a relationship and wanting to know everything about that person." Barker and the band believed that the song can provoke an emotional response due to its authenticity about knowing when you have met the right person. Guitarist Bobby Martin stated that the song shows a "more mature side" of the band that fans had yet to see in their music. Barker credited co-writer and producer Todd Clark for the "anthemic" feel of the chorus.

Critical reception
Erica Zisman of Country Swag stated that "Meet Your Mama" is a "sweet song," with "the potential to be a killer radio single," while also adding that "it is only a matter of time before the American country music fanbase catches on" to the band's music.

Commercial performance
"Meet Your Mama" was the sixth most-added Canadian song at all formats of radio in Canada for the week of February 6, 2023.

Live performance
James Barker Band performed "Meet Your Mama" live on KTLA on February 3, 2023, as part of their "Music Fest Friday" series.

Charts

References

2023 songs
2023 singles
James Barker Band songs
Songs written by James Barker (singer)
Songs written by Todd Clark
Songs written by Gavin Slate
Songs written by Travis Wood (songwriter)
Song recordings produced by Todd Clark